Motorola Moto G22 is a series of Android smartphones developed by Motorola Mobility, a subsidiary of Lenovo.

Design 
The back panel of the phone is made from plastic with a glossy finish. It weighs 185g and has a thickness of 8.49mm. It comes with a type-C charging Port, 3.5mm audio jack and has a microSD card slot. It has a 6.5-inch LCD display with 720p resolution. The average peak brightness of the phone is 500 nits with 90  Hz refresh rate.

Hardware 
Moto G22 is powered by a MediaTek chipset- Helio G37 and comes with Android 12. The phone features a 50MP primary camera with a f/1.8 aperture. It is supported by an 8MP wide-angle sensor, 2MP macro sensor, and a 2MP depth sensor. The phone has a 5000 mAh battery with 20W charging.

References

Mobile phones introduced in 2022
Android (operating system) devices
Motorola smartphones